RITEK Corporation manufactures optical discs such as CD-R, CD-RW, DVD-R, DVD-RW, DVD+R, DVD+RW, DVD-RAM, HD DVD, Blu-ray Disc and Blu-ray M-Disc, storage cards such as CF (CompactFlash) cards, SD cards and MMC cards (MultiMediaCard), memory stick and consumer electronics. Ritek also produces solar modules and touch panel products such as passive matrix OLED and ITO glass. Ritek has also launched a few products in nano- and biotechnology.

The company's English name is a portmanteau of the words “right” and “technology”.

Ritek Corporation was established in 1988 with efforts to manufacture Compact discs. In 1990 the company produced the first compact disc in Taiwan.

In November 2005 the company had a market share of 20 percent in rewritable DVDs and CD-RWs and was so the biggest disc-manufacturer worldwide.

In September 2020 Ritek has 5,900 employees.

Locations today 
Taiwan : Chungli, Hsinchu
Mainland China : Yangzhou, Kunshan
Vietnam : Ho Chi Minh City
South Korea : Cheongwon County 
The Netherlands : Ridderkerk
United States : Los Angeles

Trade marks and brand 
RITEK, RIDATA, TRAXDATA, ARITA, imation (since November 2019)

Prehistory and start 
Yeh Ching-Tai, founder of RITEK, started to manufacture and market vinyl records in 1957. In 1958, he published the album “Green Island Serenade”, performed by Zi Wei, a famous female singer of the time. At that time, the production process was completely manual. Meanwhile, the materials deteriorated easily and as a result, the yield was low. Quality depended entirely on the experience of manufacturing supervisors and the process cost a lot of time and money. During this period, Yeh Ching-Tai made improvements introducing new technologies and machines from Japan, looking for new materials and developing new manufacturing processes. Eventually the vinyl record industry in Taiwan finally began to produce better products in improved manufacturing environments.

Due to the insufficient quantity of recording equipment and facilities in Taiwan at that time, Mr. Yeh Ching-Tai felt it would be necessary to preserve Peking Opera, Nan-Guan and Bei-Guan as educational and cultural heritage. In 1980, he invested a significant amount in the creation of Platinum Studio in 1980, by importing from Switzerland a 24-track recorder. It was the first multitrack recorder in Taiwan. The studio also invited technicians from Japan to give instructions. It was at that juncture that Mr. Yeh Ching-Tai learned that the Japanese people were starting to produce Compact discs. In 1985, the R&D and ramp-up of compact discs were transforming the record industry as a new technology. Mr. Yeh Ching-Tai realized that digitalization was the trend for the record industry and he immediately initiated on R&D activities on compact discs.

In 1988 the Ritek Corporation was established, in 1990 the company produced the first compact disc in Taiwan and put an end to Taiwan's reliance on imports from Japan. This also directly contributed to the booming of the local music market.

Milestones

Before founding 
1952

Former Chairman of Ritek Corporation, Mr. Yeh Ching-Tai, set up Min Li Plastics (明理塑膠工廠) after he graduated. The factory produced plastic cigarette boxes and polyethylene milk bottles. During that period, he purchased a second-hand electroplating tool from Japan, with the original intention of plating chromium on plastics to enhance durability. However, this didn't work out. He then moved to electroplate copper and nickel on the stampers of vinyl records. This was how he got into the record business. Meanwhile, Mr. Yeh Ching-Tai established First Vintage Record and Platinum Studio.

1960

Mr. Yeh Ching-Tai, former owner of First Vintage Record and Platinum Studio was a big shot in the record business. He set up vinyl record production facilities in Sanchungpu in 1960. As part of the business for First Vintage Record, he took Sally Yeh, a famous singer, to perform and market albums throughout department stores. Mr. Yeh Ching-Tai also introduced the recording technology from Japan to establish Platinum Studio.

1980
Mr. Yeh Ching-Tai imported from Switzerland 24-track recorders and invited a technician from Japan for instructions. At that time, he mentioned that digitalization was the trend for the record industry. Japan was already trial producing compact disks. To ensure time to market, Mr. Yeh Ching-Tai recruited a group of engineers from the Industrial Technology Research Institute in 1985 to manufacture compact disks. They started with simple plastic pressing to accumulate technological expertise.

Since founding 
1988
Mr. Yeh Ching-Tai founded RITEK Corporation.

1989
The company received awards in the Geneva International Exhibition of Inventions.

1990
In May, the company manufactured the first compact disk in Taiwan with support from the Mechanical and Systems Research Laboratories, Industrial Technology Research Institute.

1991
The company became a formal member of the IFPI Members Foundation in Taiwan.

1994
The company set up facilities for the production of compact discs in Australia.

1996
Ritek Corporation had its IPO in Taiwan. 
The company initiated CMA (Compact Disk Manufacturers Association) aiming to protect copyright for CD replication.
The company set up facilities for the production of compact disks in the U.S. 
The company manufactured the first CD-RW in Taiwan. 
The company manufactured the first DVD in Taiwan.

1997
The company signed a copyright verification agreement with the Taiwan offices of the Music Publishers Association. 
The company set up facilities for the production of compact disks in the U.K. 
The company manufactured the first DVD-R in Taiwan.
The company became the first compact-disc maker in Taiwan that obtained the ISO 9001 certification.

1998
The company manufactured the first DVD-RAM in Taiwan.

1999
The company became the first compact-disc maker in Taiwan that obtained the ISO 14001 certification.
The company set up with Philips Joint venture facilities for the manufacturing of CD-R in Germany (PrimeDisc Technologies in Wiesbaden). 
The company manufactured the first OLED in Taiwan.
U-TECH Media Corporation was formed as the largest pre-recorded medium manufacturer in Taiwan. 
Ritek Foundation was established.

2000
The company became the first compact-disc maker in Taiwan that obtained the QS9000 certification.
MiniDisc by Ritek won a Taiwan Excellence Award.

2001
The company built fully automated OLED mass production lines in the world.
RiTdisplay Corporation was established as OLED manufacturer in Taiwan. 
HUTEK Corporation was established in China for the production of compact discs. 
PRORIT Corporation was founded as CD boxes and disk packaging manufacturer.

2002
Li Wenshang, Marketing Assistant Manager, Global Strategic Marketing, RITEK Corporation, indicated that RITEK is the first company in the world capable of mass-producing CD－R/RW, DVD－R/RW, DVD＋R/RW and DVD-RAM, MD (licensed by Sony), MO and Data Play. Its management philosophy is commitment to knowledge & innovation, racing against time and pursuit of customers’ satisfaction.

2003
RME was set up in Germany as a printing and packaging plant for compact discs.

2004
Ritek Japan Inc., the subsidiary in Japan, was established.

2006
 In November 2006 Ritek became exclusive producer of Maxell CD-Rs and DVDs.

2007
Ritek North Africa Inc., a subsidiary in North Africa, was established. 
AimCore Technology Co., Ltd. was established as a manufacturer of ITO glass.

2008
Ritek's memory stick as part of uniforms received iF Product Design Award from  iF International Forum Design.
Ritek entered a strategic alliance with Scheuten, a solar company in Europe.

2009
PV Next, a thin-film solar manufacturer dedicated to (copper indium gallium selenide), was established.

2011
Ritek Solar worked with SolarEdge to develop new business opportunities in solar systems. 
Ritek showcased the new IM series solar modules at Intersolar, Munich, with a 25% improvement in power generation efficiency.

2013
Ritek launched M-DISC DVD and M-DISC BD, storage solutions that promise to last hundreds of years.

2014
Ritek entered into the long-term storage medium market.

2015
Ritek started to manufacture PMOLED wearables.

2016
Ritek's solar module won the Taiwan Excellent PV Award from the Bureau of Energy, Ministry of Economic Affairs, R.O.C (Taiwan).
Ritek forged an alliance with Japan's largest chain elderly daycare center, founded Ricare Day Service Center.

2017
Ritek Group renovates the 1950s American military club and founded Brick Yard 33 1/3.
RiData OTG Flash Drive won the Gold Award for Technology Trends by PC HOME and PC ADV 3C famous and professional medias in Taiwan.

2018
Became Japan Panasonic's overseas only Archival Disc (AD) production partner.
Achieved OHSAS 18001 Occupational Health and Safety Management Certification.
Achieved ISO 14001:2015 Certification.
Green Partner Certification of Sony.
Achieved ISO 9001:2015 Certification.
Achieved BSCI (Business Social Compliance Initiative), Certification.

2019
Ritek got licences by imation.

Ritek Foundation 
Ritek Foundation was established in 1999.

Equity investments 
AimCore Technology Co., Ltd. : ITO glass
U-TECH Media Corporation : pre-recorded compact disks 
U-Chain : warehousing and logistics 
RiTdisplay Corporation : PMOLED
RiteDia : diamond-like carbon coating 
RitFast Corporation : touch panels
CASHIDO : nano technology
PRORIT Corporation: high-precision plastic injection 
RitPower: solar modules

See also
 List of companies of Taiwan

References 

Electronics companies of Taiwan
Photovoltaics
Thin-film cell manufacturers
Manufacturing companies based in Hsinchu
Taiwanese companies established in 1988
Taiwanese brands